Mobile Agriculture (mAgri) supports actors along the agriculture value chain through the use of mobile technology. Mobile technology covers a broad range of devices and the sub-categories include voice, data, network and connectivity technologies. mAgri is a subset of e-agriculture.

The introduction of mobile technology and portable, wireless devices has led to the creation of innovative services and applications that are used within the agricultural value chain in developed and developing countries. In developed markets where mechanization is more advanced and the agricultural labour force is significantly smaller than that of many developing countries, mobile agriculture applications tend to be implemented further up the value chain, for example with processors or consumers. In developing countries where a large proportion of the workforce is employed in agriculture, mobile technology is more commonly used to deliver services for producers and traders.

Applications
The GSMA's Mobile and Development Impact (MDI), an open data portal on mobile and development, has created a standard set of categories that cover applications of mobile technology in agriculture. The MDI categories were created to provide an overview of the mAgri industry and the range of mobile applications in agriculture across the world, with a focus on emerging markets. The categories listed below serve a role in the mAgri industry by providing a common framework and a standardized naming system.

Examples
Instances of the technology include:
Market intelligence/information: applications that use mobile technology to deliver or retrieve market information including prices.
 Trading facilities
 Weather information
 Peer to peer learning
 Data collection
 Financial services- payments
 Financial services- loans
 Financial services- insurance
 Learning/ advisory/ extension services: applications that use mobile technology to deliver or retrieve agricultural/agronomy information and advice.
 Geospatial applications: Applications enabling data and information related to geography and space to be managed, processed, and visualized. They contribute to land and water use planning, natural resources utilization, agricultural input supply and commodity marketing, poverty and hunger mapping, etc.
 Embedded ICT in farm equipment & processes: Applications that enable greater efficiencies in farm equipment and agricultural processes, and traceability in agricultural products’ transport and marketing through mobile technologies such as RFID, wireless Internet, and cellular telephony for labelling, traceability and identity preservation
 Operations monitoring, quality control, and product tracking
 Logistics and business processes
 Agricultural news: applications that provide news on agriculture-related subjects

References

External links
 GSMA mAgri Programme http://www.gsma.com/magri
 GSMA M4D Impact portal http://www.m4dimpact.com/data/sectors/mobile-agriculture
 e-Agriculture Community http://www.e-agriculture.org
 USAID's ICT and Agriculture Allnet community http://www.ictforag.org
 InfoDev and WorldBank (2011). ICT in Agriculture Sourcebook https://web.archive.org/web/20130103185142/http://www.ictinagriculture.org/ictinag/node/105
 World Bank (2011). Mobile Applications for Agriculture and Rural Development http://siteresources.worldbank.org/INFORMATIONANDCOMMUNICATIONANDTECHNOLOGIES/Resources/MobileApplications_for_ARD.pdf
 USAID Office of Mobile Solutions (2012). Mobile Agriculture: Understanding the Challenges and Opportunities for Sustainable Mobile Agriculture Solutions https://web.archive.org/web/20130222001949/https://communities.usaidallnet.gov/ictforag/node/286
 ICTupdate web magazine http://ictupdate.cta.int/

E-agriculture